was a railway station on the Koizumi Line in Ōra, Ōra District, Gunma, Japan, which was operated by the private railway operator Tobu Railway.

History 
The station opened on June 28, 1931, as a station on the Koizumi Line, then operated by the Joshu Railway.

Kobugannon Station closed together with Mujinazuka Station on December 25, 1941, after the Koizumi Line was purchased by Tobu Railway in 1937.

Adjacent stations 
Shinozuka Station - Kobugannon Station - Higashi-Koizumi Station

Surrounding area 
  at coordinates

References 
 Ora-machi town history (local guide)

Defunct railway stations in Japan
Railway stations in Gunma Prefecture
Railway stations in Japan opened in 1931
Railway stations closed in 1941